Andrei Mikalajevič Aramnaǔ (born 17 April 1988) is a Belarusian weightlifter, Olympic and World Champion.

Career
Andrei was born with six fingers on one hand, but had one removed in 2002 before his coach allowed him to train for the European Championships.

He won silver in the 94 kg category at the 2006 Junior World Championships, with a total of 393 kg. At the 2007 Junior World Championships he won gold in the 105 kg category, with a total of 407 kg.

Aramnau became world champion in the 105 kg category at the 2007 World Championships, with a total of 423 kg.

At the 2008 Summer Olympics he won the gold medal in the 105 kg category with world records in the snatch with 200 kg, in the clean and jerk with 236 kg, and with a total of 436 kg. These records have been nullified after the International Weightlifting Federation reorganized the categories. He was scheduled to compete at the 2012 Olympic Games but injured his leg in training and did not compete.

He was named 2008 Belarus Athlete of the Year.

He won the gold medal in the 105 kg category at the 2010 European Championships, with 420 kg in total but then had the medal stripped due to a doping violation.

Major results

References

External links

1988 births
Living people
People from Barysaw
Belarusian male weightlifters
Belarusian people of Russian descent
Doping cases in weightlifting
European Weightlifting Championships medalists
Medalists at the 2008 Summer Olympics
Olympic gold medalists for Belarus
Olympic medalists in weightlifting
Olympic weightlifters of Belarus
Weightlifters at the 2008 Summer Olympics
World record holders in Olympic weightlifting
World Weightlifting Championships medalists
Sportspeople from Minsk Region